Alan Pulido Izaguirre (born 8 March 1991) is a Mexican professional footballer who plays as a striker for Major League Soccer club Sporting Kansas City.

Pulido started his career with Tigres UANL in 2010. Contractual disputes with Tigres UANL following the summer of 2014 resulted in him making no appearances for the 2014 Apertura tournament. In February 2015, he would appear with Greek club Levadiakos and eventually join Olympiacos in the summer of the same year. In August 2016, he joined Liga MX club Guadalajara for a then-club record fee of US$7.15 million. Winning a league Double, the 2018 CONCACAF Champions League, and various individual awards, he joined Sporting Kansas City for another record fee of US$9.5 million.

He has represented the U-20, U-23, and senior national teams. He has been called up to participate in the 2011 Copa América and the 2014 FIFA World Cup.

Club career

Tigres UANL
Pulido made his debut with Tigres UANL in an official competition in 2009 playing in that year's edition of the SuperLiga tournament, playing the entirety of the match against Major League Soccer side Chivas USA on 20 June, scoring in the 11th minute as Tigres UANL won 2–1. Tigres UANL would reach the final to face against Chicago Fire, and won 4–3 on penalties following a 1–1 draw.

On 27 February 2010, Pulido made his debut in the Primera División coming on as a substitute after the half-time break in the 0–3 defeat to Monarcas Morelia. He scored his first league goal on 13 April 2011 in the 4–2 win over Pachuca at the Estadio Universitario.

Pulido scored the third goal in the 3–1 second-leg victory of the 2011 Apertura Final against Santos Laguna on 11 December, winning his first league title and helping secure the club's third league title, the first in over thirty years. Throughout the tournament, Pulido was subdued to a substitute role, behind first-choice striker Héctor Mancilla, and received limited playing time.

He was a pivotal piece in the club's winning of the Clausura 2014 Copa MX, where he finished with the tournament's top scorer, scoring 11 times within 10 matches.

Transfer dispute
After participating with the Mexico national football team at the 2014 World Cup, Pulido was meant to rejoin Tigres to prepare for the upcoming 2014 Apertura tournament. After alleged interest from several European clubs, among them Greek side Olympiacos, Pulido stated that his contract with Tigres had ended and was thus a free agent, though club personnel claimed Pulido had signed a contract extension that would keep him with the club until June 2016. Pulido did not attend any of the club's pre-season training sessions and was separated from the first team and sent to train with the reserves as a result, with Pulido also failing to appear at the training sessions. He subsequently did not participate in the Apertura tournament.

In November of that year, Pulido and his representative started a legal dispute against Tigres via the Mexican Football Federation, claiming the signature on the addendum of the contract was falsified. The Federation ultimately ruled in favor of Tigres, though another complaint was filed with the Court of Arbitration for Sport (CAS).

Levadiakos
On 29 January 2015, it was reported that Pulido had signed a one-and-a-half year contract with Greek club Levadiakos, with the deal being confirmed by both Pulido – who announced the transfer via his Twitter account – and the club. However that same day, Tigres issued a press release declaring that CAS had ruled in their favor and would reject the transfer, with the court stating that ‘there is not a risk of irreparable damage to the player, because such damage, if exists, is caused by the player himself who decided not to re-join Tigres’. Pulido's request for a provisional transfer had also been denied by CAS, though another request was submitted to FIFA. On 2 February, Pulido participated in his first training session with Levadiakos. On 27 February, a provisional transfer was granted to Pulido by FIFA's Player's Status Committee, thus allowing him to play for Levadiakos while the legal dispute continued.

On 9 March 2015, Pulido scored on his official league debut with Levadiakos in the 3–1 win against Platanias, and was named man of the match.

He completed the campaign with six games played and one goal scored as Levadiakos finished 14th in the table

Olympiacos
On 3 July 2015, Olympiacos announced the signing of Pulido from Levadiakos. Prior to the move, Mexican club Guadalajara claimed they had purchased fifty percent of the player's rights during the annual league draft, and were awaiting on a verdict from the resolution from CAS in favor of Tigres UANL, who as a result could negotiate with Guadalajara over Pulido.

On 13 January 2016, Pulido started his first match for Olympiacos in the Greek Cup match against Chania, scoring the fifth goal in the 6–0 victory. On 18 January, he made his debut with the club in the Super League in a 0–0 draw game against Platanias. Five days later, Pulido played all 90 minutes and scored the only goal in a 1–0 victory against Xanthi. On 28 February, Pulido scored the third goal in the 3–0 win over Veria, meaning Olympiacos won the league with six matches to spare, 21 points clear of second-place AEK Athens.

Guadalajara
On 30 August 2016 it was announced that Pulido was returning to Mexico to play for Guadalajara for a reported US$7.15 million(€6 million), making Pulido Guadalajara's most expensive signing at the time. Pulido made his league debut with Guadalajara on 10 September, coming on as a substitute in the second half in a 2–0 victory over Chiapas. The following week, he scored his first goal with the club in a 2–1 loss against Toluca.

In April 2017, Guadalajara won the Clausura Copa MX final against Monarcas Morelia after defeating them in a penalty shoot-out in which he scored. The following month, the Clausura championship was disputed against his former club, Tigres UANL. In the first leg at Estadio Universitario, he scored the first goal in a 2–2 draw. In the return leg at Estadio Chivas, he scored the first goal of the match again — a goal named as Goal of the Tournament — this time the final score being 2–1 in Guadalajara's favor meaning they were crowned champions for the first time since the Apertura 2006 and won their first Double since the 1969–70 season. He was included in the Clausura's Best XI and named as the tournament's most valuable player as well.

On 17 April 2018, during the first leg of the CONCACAF Champions League finals against Major League Soccer club Toronto FC, Pulido would score from a free kick, helping his team attain a 2–1 victory — the goal was named as Goal of the Tournament. Guadalajara went on to win the finals after defeating them in a penalty shoot-out 4–2 following a 3–3 aggregate draw; managing to score during the shoot-out.

Pulido finished the Apertura 2019 as one of the joint top goalscorers with 12 goals and was the first Mexican to score the most goals in a tournament since Ángel Reyna in the Clausura 2011 with 11 goals. Pulido was subsequently awarded the Golden Boot and included in the Apertura's Best XI.

Sporting Kansas City
On 11 December 2019 it was announced that Pulido will play for Major League Soccer club Sporting Kansas City on a four-year contract for a reported US$9.5 million (€9.2 million) as a Designated Player, making his transfer the most expensive in the history of the club.

On 29 February 2020, Pulido scored a goal in his debut match against Vancouver Whitecaps in a 3–1 victory. On 3 October, he returned to the lineup following a hamstring injury and scored his first brace in a 2–1 victory over Houston Dynamo, leading him to being named MLS Player of the Week.

At the end of the regular season, Pulido was nominated as a finalist for that year's MLS Newcomer of the Year Award and was awarded the club's Offensive Player of the Year award.

International career

Youth
Pulido scored three goals in the group stage of the 2011 CONCACAF U-20 Championship in Guatemala and helped Mexico win the tournament and qualify to the under-20 World Cup in Colombia held that same year.

Pulido was included in the roster that participated at said tournament, as Mexico placed third.

Pulido received his first call up to the senior national team by Luis Fernando Tena for the 2011 Copa América, a team largely composed of under-23 players due to the close proximity of the recently concluded Gold Cup, but did not appear in any matches.

On 23 March 2012, Pulido scored the opening goal in Mexico's 7–1 win over Trinidad and Tobago in the 2012 CONCACAF Olympic Qualifying Tournament held in the United States. Two days later, he scored a hat-trick in Mexico's 3–0 victory over Honduras. His fifth goal came in the semi-final match against Canada, making him joint-top-scorer, along with teammate Marco Fabián.

In the summer of that year, Mexico won the Toulon Tournament, with Pulido scoring his only goal in the competition in the 3–0 win over Turkey in the Final.

Senior
On 29 January 2014, Pulido scored a hat-trick on his debut appearance against South Korea, with Mexico going on to win the match 4–0. On 2 April, he scored the second goal in the 2–2 draw against the United States in a friendly match at the University of Phoenix Stadium.

On 2 June 2014, Pulido was named in Mexico's squad for the World Cup in Brazil. He did not appear in any match.

Alan Pulido was originally included in the roster for the 2017 Gold Cup, but withdrew from the list after picking up an injury in a friendly match against Paraguay and was subsequently replaced by Erick Torres Padilla.

Kidnapping
On 28 May 2016, Pulido attended a party with his girlfriend in a rural area in Ciudad Victoria, Tamaulipas. After leaving the party at 11:30 p.m., he drove through a highway and was cut off by a vehicle. Pulido and his girlfriend were then forcibly taken by six masked gunmen. His girlfriend was later released unharmed. His family members contacted the police and the case was escalated to all three levels of law enforcement. On 30 May, Pulido managed to escape by overpowering one of his captors and taking one of his guns. The other captor ran from the scene after Pulido destroyed the windows of the room he was in. Once he was safe, Pulido dialed 066, the emergency number, to contact law enforcement and give his location. In the operation, at least one person was arrested; Pulido was sent to a hospital for medical examination. He suffered a minor injury in his right hand for breaking through the window to escape the kidnapper's safe house, where he was being held.

Career statistics

Club

International

Scores and results list Mexico's goal tally first, score column indicates score after each Pulido goal.

Honours
Tigres UANL
Mexican Primera División: Apertura 2011
Copa MX: Clausura 2014

Olympiacos
Super League Greece: 2015–16

Guadalajara
Liga MX: Clausura 2017
Copa MX: Clausura 2017
CONCACAF Champions League: 2018

Mexico Youth
FIFA U-20 World Cup third place: 2011
CONCACAF Olympic Qualifying Championship: 2012
Toulon Tournament: 2012

Individual
CONCACAF Olympic Qualifying Championship Golden Boot (Shared): 2012
Copa MX Top Scorer: Clausura 2014
Liga MX Best XI: Clausura 2017, Apertura 2019
Liga MX Most Valuable Player: Clausura 2017
Liga MX Best Goal: 2016–17
Liga MX Player of the Month: November 2019
CONCACAF Champions League Goal of the Tournament: 2018
Liga MX Golden Boot (Shared): Apertura 2019
Sporting Kansas City Offensive Player of the Year: 2020

References

External links

 
 
 

1991 births
2011 Copa América players
2014 FIFA World Cup players
2021 CONCACAF Gold Cup players
Living people
Mexican expatriate footballers
Mexican footballers
Footballers from Tamaulipas
People from Ciudad Victoria
Tigres UANL footballers
Levadiakos F.C. players
Olympiacos F.C. players
C.D. Guadalajara footballers
Liga MX players
Super League Greece players
Association football forwards
Mexico youth international footballers
Mexico under-20 international footballers
Mexico international footballers
Expatriate footballers in Greece
Kidnapped Mexican people
Major League Soccer players
Sporting Kansas City players